Antonio José Ledezma Díaz (born 1 May 1955) is a Venezuelan lawyer, politician and former political prisoner. After unsuccessfully challenging for the leadership of Democratic Action in 1999, he founded a new party, the Fearless People's Alliance.

Political history
After involvement in politics in his home state of Guárico in the 1970s for Democratic Action, he served two terms in the Venezuelan Chamber of Deputies (from 1984), and was elected to the Venezuelan Senate in 1994. He then served as mayor of the Libertador Municipality (1996–2000) of the Venezuelan Capital District, having been appointed governor of the now-defunct Federal District (1992–1993) by Carlos Andrés Pérez.

Mayor of Caracas
In 2008, he challenged pro-government PSUV and Fatherland for All candidate Aristóbulo Istúriz in the 2008 Caracas mayoral election and won. Subsequent to his election, the Venezuelan National Assembly passed a Capital District Law on April 30, 2009, that transferred most functions, funding, and personnel of the Metropolitan Mayor of Caracas to a new Venezuelan Capital District (headed by Jacqueline Faría, an official directly appointed by Hugo Chávez) covering in particular the political center of Caracas and the municipality of Libertador. A legal challenge was filed and a request was filed with the National Electoral Council to hold a referendum, but these did not stop the transfer. Opponents of Chávez described the move as a deliberate negation of the popular vote, while Chávez supporters described the political and budgetary reorganization as an "act of justice" for Libertador, the largest and poorest of the five municipalities making up Caracas. Following the removal of such power, Ledezma began a hunger strike that drew international attention.

Arrest

On February 19, 2015, he was detained by the Bolivarian Intelligence Service at his office in the EXA Tower in Caracas. In the operation, the security forces made warning shots to the air to disperse a crowd that was forming. He was then transported to SEBIN's headquarters in Plaza Venezuela. His lawyer declared that the charges for his detention were unknown. Ledezma was arrested by the Venezuelan Government after accusations made by President Nicolás Maduro about an "American plot to overthrow the government" that he presented a week before Ledezma's arrest. Ledezma mocked the accusations stating that the Venezuelan government was destabilizing itself through corruption. The United States rejected the accusations by President Maduro and stated that "Venezuela’s problems cannot be solved by criminalizing dissent". He was imprisoned in Ramo Verde military jail. Two months later, he was sent back home for health reasons, where he had been placed under house arrest and unable to express himself publicly.

Response to arrest

Demonstrations

Following the news of the arrest of Ledezma, his supporters quickly created protests and called the arrest a "kidnapping" and that the coup conspiracy was created for political purposes. Hours after the news broke, hundreds of Ledezma supporters gathered in a Caracas plaza to denounce his arrest. Protesters also gathered outside of the SEBIN headquarters.

Human rights groups
Human rights groups quickly condemned Ledezma's arrest and the similarity of the case to Leopoldo López's arrest was noted by The New York Times. Amnesty International condemned Ledezma's arrest calling it politically motivated, noting the similar cases of arrests made by the Venezuelan Government in what Amnesty International described as "silencing dissenting voices". Human Rights Watch demanded his release with Human Rights Watch's Americas division director, Jose Miguel Vivanco, stating that without evidence, Ledezma "faces another case of arbitrary detention of opponents in a country where there is no judicial independence".

Trial
In March 2015, former socialist Prime Minister of Spain, Felipe González, agreed to take over the defense of Ledezma in his trial after Ledezma's family requested his assistance.

Escape from house arrest
On November 17, 2017, Ledezma slipped past guards and fled to Colombia. He departed the same day from El Dorado International Airport to Adolfo Suárez Madrid–Barajas Airport in Madrid, Spain. Upon landing he declared he would continue his fight of opposition to the Venezuelan government and was reunited with his family.

Exile 
Ledezma signed the Madrid Charter, a document drafted by the conservative Spanish political party Vox that describes left-wing groups as enemies of Ibero-America involved in a "criminal project" that are "under the umbrella of the Cuban regime".

Awards and recognition
 2010 – Finalist for the 2010 World Mayor prize.
 2015 – National Endowment for Democracy awarded Ledezma its Democracy Award in May 2015.
 2015 – Cádiz Cortes Ibero-American Freedom Prize was awarded "given the unblemished defense of freedom in your community and minimum requirements of the realization of human rights in the same, which has led them to be subject to public rebuke of their government, including the flagrant situation of imprisonment or the cutting of your minimal civil rights".
 2016 Courage Award, Geneva Summit for Human Rights and Democracy, shared with Leopoldo Lopez, "for inspiring the world with their extraordinary courage in the defense of liberty and universal human rights."

References 

1955 births
People from Guárico
20th-century Venezuelan lawyers
Members of the Senate of Venezuela
Members of the Venezuelan Chamber of Deputies
Living people
Democratic Action (Venezuela) politicians
Mayors of places in Venezuela
Fearless People's Alliance politicians
Universidad Santa María (Venezuela) alumni
Escapees from Venezuelan detention
People of the Crisis in Venezuela
Universidad Metropolitana alumni
Venezuelan escapees
Hunger strikers
Signers of the Madrid Charter